Langner is a Geman surname. Notable people with the surname include:

 David Langner (1951–2014), American football player
 Gerard Langner, Polish ice hockey player
 Karol Langner (1843–1912), Polish priest
 Lawrence Langner (1890–1962), Welsh-born American playwright
 Paul Langner, German ice hockey player
 Władysław Langner (1896—1972), Polish Army general

German-language surnames